Vozokany may refer to:

 Vozokany, Galanta District
 Vozokany, Topoľčany District